Steven John Puidokas (April 12, 1955 – August 12, 1994) was an American professional basketball player in Europe.  He played college basketball for the Washington State Cougars from 1973 to 1977. He left Washington State as both their all-time leading scorer with 1,894 points and all-time leading rebounder with 992 rebounds. He was inducted posthumously into the Pac-12 Conference Men's Basketball Hall of Honor in 2012.

Puidokas was the first Washington State men's basketball player to have his number (55) retired, and remained the only one until the school retired Klay Thompson's in 2020.

As a high school player, Puidokas was named a third-team All-American by Parade Magazine in 1973.

Personal life
In 1955, Steve Puidokas was born in a Lithuanian American family of John Julian Puidokas and Genovaitė Giedraitis in Chicago. Puidokas was married to an Italian woman and had five children. He died at the age of 39 because of problems with his heart while living in Sardinia, Italy.

References

1955 births
1994 deaths
American expatriate basketball people in Italy
American expatriate basketball people in the Netherlands
American men's basketball players
American people of Lithuanian descent
Basketball players from Chicago
Centers (basketball)
Parade High School All-Americans (boys' basketball)
Power forwards (basketball)
Basketball players with retired numbers
Washington Bullets draft picks
Washington State Cougars men's basketball players